Deixa-me amar was a 2007 Portuguese telenovela, based in the Argentine telenovela You Are the One. The main actors were Paula Lobo Antunes as Lara Guerra (a female boxer) and Paulo Pires as businessman Martim Botelho.

References

2007 telenovelas
Portuguese telenovelas
2007 Portuguese television series debuts
2008 Portuguese television series endings
Televisão Independente telenovelas
Portuguese-language telenovelas